Caney Creek High School is a high school in Montgomery County, Texas, near Conroe. It is part of the Conroe Independent School District.  Caney Creek serves several areas in Montgomery County, including the city of Cut and Shoot, the unincorporated community of Grangerland, and a portion of the Porter Heights CDP. In 2018–2019, the school received a C grade from the Texas Education Agency.

The school was established in 1996, located on the east side of the same building as Moorhead Junior High School. In 2008 Moorhead Junior High moved into a new building, and Caney Creek High School's 9th graders occupied where MJHS originally was.

Demographics
In the 2018–2019 school year, there were 2,094 students enrolled at Caney Creek High School. The ethnic distribution of students was as follows: 
 1.2% African American
 0.4% Asian
 54.3% Hispanic
 0.3% American Indian
 0.1% Pacific Islander
 42.4% White
 1.2% Two or More Races.

73.5% of students were eligible for free or reduced-cost lunch. The school received Title I funding.

Academics
For each school year, the Texas Education Agency rates school performance using an A–F grading system based on statistical data. For 2018–2019, the school received a score of 79 out of 100, resulting in a C grade. The school received a score of 75 the previous year.

Feeder schools
Elementary schools (K–4) that feed Caney Creek High School include:
Austin 
Creighton
Hope 
Milam
San Jacinto

Grangerland Intermediate (5–6), and Moorhead Junior High (7–8) also feed Caney Creek High School.

Athletics
The Caney Creek Panthers compete in the following sports: 
Cross Country, Volleyball, Football, Basketball, Powerlifting, Swimming, Soccer, Golf, Tennis, Track, Wrestling, Softball & Baseball.

Trivia
In September 2006, a parent requested that Caney Creek High School remove Ray Bradbury's Fahrenheit 451 from the curriculum, citing language and religious concerns; this request occurred during the American Library Association's "Banned Books Week".

References

External links

Official site
School profile

Conroe Independent School District high schools